Łączka  is a village in Gmina Dębowiec, Cieszyn County, Silesian Voivodeship, southern Poland. It has a population of 288 (2004).

The name is of Slavic and topographic origins and literally means a small meadow.

History 
It lies in the historical region of Cieszyn Silesia. It could have been first mentioned in the letter issued by Wenceslaus I, Duke of Cieszyn on 12 March 1434 in which he bestowed a place called Lochni/Locheny (Łączka?) adjacent to Kiesselaw (Kisielów) upon Ticzko von Logau (who would be therefore its noble owner). It was later mentioned in 1466 (od Luczkey hranicy), 1573 (w Lucze) and so on. Politically it belonged then to the Duchy of Teschen, a fee of the Kingdom of Bohemia, which after 1526 became a part of the Habsburg monarchy.

After the Revolutions of 1848 in the Austrian Empire a modern municipal division was introduced in the re-established Austrian Silesia. The village as a municipality was subscribed to the political district of Bielsko and the legal district of Skoczów. According to the censuses conducted in 1880, 1890, 1900 and 1910 the population of the municipality grew from 135 in 1880 to 143 in 1910, all of them were native Polish-speakers mostly Roman Catholics (56% in 1910), followed by Protestants (44% in 1910). The village was also traditionally inhabited by Cieszyn Vlachs, speaking Cieszyn Silesian dialect.

After World War I, the fall of Austria-Hungary, the Polish–Czechoslovak War and the division of Cieszyn Silesia in 1920, it became a part of Poland. It was then annexed by Nazi Germany at the beginning of World War II. After the war it was restored to Poland.

Geography 

References

Villages in Cieszyn County
Cieszyn Silesia